John Sullins (born September 7, 1969) is a former American football linebacker. He played for the Denver Broncos in 1992.

References

1969 births
Living people
American football linebackers
Alabama Crimson Tide football players
Denver Broncos players